Loïsa Puget (11 February 1810 – 24 October 1889) was a French composer.

Life
Loïsa Puget was born in Paris, her proper first names were Louise Françoise. Her mother was a singer and saw that her daughter received a musical education including study at the same school as George Sand. Her composition teacher was Adolphe Adam. After completing her studies, Puget composed and performed her own music in salons and married her lyricist Gustave Lemoine (1802–1885) in 1845. She was most productive between 1830 and 1845 – apart from some operas she composed the music for over 300 songs. Many of her songs also appeared in editions with guitar accompaniment, some of which were made by prominent guitarists such as Matteo Carcassi.

In 1841 Lemoine and Adolphe d'Ennery wrote a melodrama based on Puget's most successful song À la grâce de Dieu, which provided the idea for Donizetti's Linda di Chamounix.

Puget died in Pau.

Works

Stage
Le Mauvais œil, opera (1836)
La Veilleuse, ou les Nuits de Milady (1869)

Songs (to words by Gustave Lemoine)
À la grâce de Dieu (ca. 1840)
Adieu, Cousine 
Appelle-moi ta mère (1844)
Ave Maria, prière
Belle pour lui!
Demain, je serai dame (1838)
Dis-moi: Je t’aime! (1840?)
Du temps que la Reine Berthe filait
Fleur des champs (1840)
Je veux t'aimer sans te le dire (1838)
Jeune fille à quinze ans
L'Aigle (1839)
La bénédiction d’un père (1860?)
Le bon curé patience (1843?)
La chanson du charbonnier, ou blanc et noir (1839)
Le chasseur et la laitière (1838) 
Le ciel sur terre (1841) 
La coquette de soixante ans (1835?) 
La crèche
La demande en mariage (1842)
La dot d’Auvergne (1840?)
Les deux âmes (1837)
Les honneurs partagés
Le lys dans la vallée (1835?)
Le nom de Marie (1845)
La reine des fous (1838)
La sérénade du pâtre (1840?)
La voix tendre (1841)
Morte d’amour! (1840)
Narbonnaise (1840)
Ne quittez jamais votre mère
Ta dot
Tempête (1838)

Piano

 Trois Quadrilles de Contredanses pour le piano sur les motifs de l'Opéra Le Mauvais Oeil.

References

External links
 Tsou, Judy, and William Cheng. "Puget, Loïsa." Grove Music Online. 23 Mar. 2018. http://www.oxfordmusiconline.com/grovemusic/view/10.1093/gmo/9781561592630.001.0001/omo-9781561592630-e-0000022525. 
 

1810 births
1889 deaths
19th-century classical composers
19th-century French composers
French women classical composers
Pupils of Adolphe Adam
French Romantic composers
19th-century women composers